Banda is a village in East Godavari district in the state of Andhra Pradesh in India.

Geography

Demographics
As of Census 2011, Banda has population of 705 of which 322 were males while 383 were females. Population of child (age 0-6) was 113 which makes up 16.03% of total population of village. Literacy rate of the village was 62.84%.

References 

Villages in East Godavari district